Yapolot is a village in Rivne Raion, Rivne Oblast, Ukraine, but was formerly administered within Kostopil Raion. As of the year 2001, the community had 823 residents. The postal index is 35021, and the KOATUU code is 5623487801.

References 

Villages in Rivne Raion